Carlos Antonio Muñoz Martínez (13 November 1964 – 26 December 1993) was an Ecuadorian football forward, who was nicknamed "Frentón".

Club career
Born in Machala, Muñoz started his career at Everest and played for Olmedo, Audaz Octubrino,  Filanbanco and Barcelona.

International career
Born in Guayaquil he was a member of the Ecuador national football team for four years, and obtained a total number of 35 caps during his career, scoring four goals. He made his debut on 15 March 1989 in a friendly against Brazil.

Personal life and death
Muñoz died in a car accident on 26 December 1993. He was survived by his son Carlos Antonio Muñoz Vergara, daughter Maria Muñoz Vergara and wife Violeta Vergara.

Honours

Club
 Barcelona Sporting Club
 Serie A de Ecuador: 1991

Individual
 Barcelona Sporting Club
 Serie A de Ecuador: Top scorer 1992

References

External links

 Info

1967 births
1993 deaths
People from Machala
Association football forwards
Ecuadorian footballers
Ecuador international footballers
1989 Copa América players
1991 Copa América players
1993 Copa América players
C.D. Everest footballers
C.D. Olmedo footballers
Barcelona S.C. footballers
Road incident deaths in Ecuador